Scanu is a surname. Notable people with the surname include:

Pasqual Scanu (1908–1978), Italian educator and writer
Valerio Scanu (born 1990), Italian singer
Giovanni Scanu (born 1975), Italian football manager